The Broad Brook Canal is a water-supply canal feeding the Springfield Reservoir (a.k.a. the Ludlow Reservoir) in Ludlow, Massachusetts, a public water supply for the city of Springfield, Massachusetts. Its northern segment is also known as the Jabish Canal.

The canal was first constructed circa 1875. This water, however, was thought to be of poor quality, and thus in 1890–1891 the canal was extended north through the Belchertown Reservoir to Jabish Brook, east of Broad Brook.

References 
 Springfield (Massachusetts) Board of Water Commissioners, Report for the year ending Dec. 31, 1875, page 61.
 Moses Nelson Baker, The Manual of American Water-works, New York : Engineering News Publishing Company, 1891, page 41. 
 Massachusetts Department of Public Health, Examinations by the State Board of Health of the Water Supplies and Inland Waters of Massachusetts, Wright & Potter Printing Co., 1890, page 297.

Bodies of water of Hampden County, Massachusetts
Canals in Massachusetts
Canals opened in 1875
Transportation buildings and structures in Hampden County, Massachusetts